"The Dealer" is a 2014 song by the American singer/songwriter Stevie Nicks. It was the first single from her solo album, 24 Karat Gold: Songs from the Vault. The song was a minor hit in Belgium, where it peaked at No. 72 on the Wallonia Tip chart.

Background
The song was written in 1979 for Fleetwood Mac's "Tusk" album but it was left unreleased. A bootleg recording of the song was found on YouTube by Nicks' manager. Nicks was inspired to re-record her songs on YouTube that never saw an official release.

Charts

References

External links
stevienicksofficial.com
http://www.fleetwoodmacnews.com/p/stevie-nicks_10.html

Stevie Nicks songs
2014 singles
Songs written by Stevie Nicks
1979 songs